Datuk Yakub Khan (born 24 November 1961) is a Malaysian politician who is serving as the Minister of State of Sabah for Science, Technology and Innovation. He has served as Senator in the Malaysian Parliament since May 2020 and Member of the Sabah State Legislative Assembly (MLA) for Karambunai since September 2020. He is a member of the United Malays National Organisation (UMNO) which is aligned with the ruling Perikatan Nasional (PN) coalition both in federal and state levels.

Election results

Honours 
 :
  Commander of the Order of Kinabalu (PGDK) – Datuk  (2015)

References

1961 births
Living people
Bajau people
Malaysian people of Pakistani descent
Malaysian Muslims
United Malays National Organisation politicians
Members of the Sabah State Legislative Assembly
Commanders of the Order of Kinabalu
21st-century Malaysian politicians